The 1995–96 season was Burnley's first season in the third tier of English football.

Appearances and goals

|}

Transfers

In

Out

Matches

Second Division

Final league position

League Cup

1st Round First Leg

1st Round Second Leg

2nd Round First Leg

2nd Round Second Leg

FA Cup

1st round

Football League Trophy

Northern Section 1st Round Group stage

Northern Section 1st Round Group stage

Northern Section 1st Round Group stage

Northern Section Quarter-final

References

Burnley F.C. seasons
Burnley